St. Paul Lutheran Church is a small historic frame church in located about  north of Mansura, Louisiana.

It was built in 1916 to replace a previous building and features elements of the Gothic Revival and Queen Anne Revival styles. The main historic importance of this building was its usage as a school for local residents since its construction in 1916 through the late 1930s, as it was the only available educational opportunity for local black children until it ceased to be used as a school.

The church was added to the National Register of Historic Places in 1990.

References

See also
National Register of Historic Places listings in Avoyelles Parish, Louisiana

Lutheran churches in Louisiana
Churches on the National Register of Historic Places in Louisiana
Gothic Revival church buildings in Louisiana
Queen Anne architecture in Louisiana
Churches completed in 1916
Churches in Avoyelles Parish, Louisiana
National Register of Historic Places in Avoyelles Parish, Louisiana
1916 establishments in Louisiana